Slutsky Uyezd was one of the uyezds of Minsk Governorate and the Governorate-General of Minsk of the Russian Empire and then of Byelorussian Soviet Socialist Republic with its center in Slutsk from 1793 until its formal abolition in 1924 by Soviet authorities.

Demographics
At the time of the Russian Empire Census of 1897, Slutsky Uyezd had a population of 260,499. Of these, 78.5% spoke Belarusian, 15.7% Yiddish, 3.5% Polish, 1.8% Russian, 0.8% Ukrainian, 0.3% Tatar and 0.1% German as their native language.

References

 
Uezds of Minsk Governorate